Hélène Boucher (23 May 1908 - 30 November 1934) was a well-known French pilot in the early 1930s, when she set several women's world speed records and the all-comers record for 1,000 km (621 mi) in 1934.  She was killed in an accident in the same year.

Biography 

Hélène Boucher was the daughter of a Parisian architect; after an ordinary schooling she experienced flight at Orly and then became the first pupil at the flying school run by Henri Fabos at Mont-de-Marsan. She rapidly obtained her brevet (no. 182) aged 23, bought a de Havilland Gypsy Moth and learned to navigate and perform aerobatics. Her great ability was recognised by Michel Detroyat who advised her to focus on aerobatics, his own speciality. Their performances drew in crowds to flight shows, for example at Villacoublay. and her skills gained her public transport brevet in June 1932.  After attending a few aviation meetings, she sold the Moth and bought an Avro Avian, planning a flight to the Far East; in the event she got  as far as Damascus and returned via North Africa, limited by financial difficulties.

They were the only female team competing and received the prize of 3,000 francs set aside for an all-women team as well as 3,000 francs for position. The following year, on a contract with the Caudron company and in a faster Caudron Rafale she competed again, coming second.

Most of these records were flown in Renault-powered Caudron aircraft, and in June 1934 the Renault company also took her temporarily under contract in order to promote their new Viva Grand Sport.

On 30 November 1934 she died aged 26 flying a Caudron C.430 Rafale near Versailles when the machine crashed into the woods of Guyancourt. Posthumously, she was immediately made a knight of the Légion d'honneur and was the first woman to lie in state at Les Invalides, where her obsequies were held. She is buried in Yermenonville cemetery.

World records 

In 1934 in a Caudron C.450 she set two more records.
 

Legacy
After her death several memorials of different kinds were set up. 1935 saw the first running of a competition for female pilots, the Boucher Cup.

A brand new, art-deco styled, Girls High School (Lycée Hélène Boucher) built in 1935 in Paris (75 cours de Vincennes) was named after her as she was considered a model for future generations of "modernistic", forward thinking girls. École Hélène Boucher in Mantes-la-Jolie is named after her.

There is a stone in the Guyancourt woods where the crash happened, a tomb monument at Yermenonville, and various squares and street names remember her.

References

Literature 
 Antoine Rédier: Hélène Boucher, jeune fille de France, Flammarion in 1935 with a preface by Victor Denain.

1908 births
1934 deaths
Aviators from Paris
Lycée Montaigne (Paris) alumni
French women aviators
Aviators killed in aviation accidents or incidents in France
Victims of aviation accidents or incidents in 1934
Chevaliers of the Légion d'honneur
French aviation record holders
French women aviation record holders
20th-century French women